"Shea Butter Baby" is a song by American singer Ari Lennox and American rapper J. Cole. The song was produced by Elite and Shroom, and was originally released on November 16, 2018, on the soundtrack for the sports drama film Creed II, titled Creed II: The Album. It was later released as a single on February 26, 2019, for Ari Lennox's album Shea Butter Baby.

Background
The song made an appearance in the film Creed II, as Ari Lennox spoke to Billboard during her Creed II red carpet interview on what inspired her to create the song and cited her influences saying:

Recording and composition
In an interview with Billboard, Elite talked about how the song was created saying, "We were at my place in L.A. and making a bunch of songs. It happened really quickly. I made the beat really fast. She came up with the song really fast. We recorded it. We looked at it like just another [song], and we sent it around to our team." A few months later, they revisited the track to find what songs will make the album, and Cole immediately wanted to get on the song.

Music video
The lyric video for the song was released on November 18, 2018, with selections of multiple different scenes from Creed II. The official music video was released on February 20, 2019, and was directed by Bennett Johnson, which surpassed 3 million views via YouTube within the first week. The video depicts the ups and downs of a relationship between Ari and her partner. Cole also appears around the halfway mark of the video as he spits his verse while standing in a vacant space with Lennox.

Credits and personnel
Credits and personnel adapted from Tidal and Spotify.

 Courtney Shenade Salter – main artist, composer, lyricist
 Jermaine Cole – main artist, composer, lyricist
 Anthony Parrino – composer, lyricist
 Tim Schoegje – composer, lyricist
 Elite – producer
 Shroom – additional producer

Charts

Certifications

Release history

References 

2018 songs
2019 singles
Ari Lennox songs
J. Cole songs
Songs from Rocky (film series)
Songs written by Ari Lennox
Songs written by J. Cole
Dreamville Records singles
Interscope Records singles